The Virginia Cavaliers men's tennis team represents the University of Virginia in NCAA Division I men's tennis as part of the Atlantic Coast Conference. The team is coached by Andres Pedroso. Since 2021, the Cavaliers have played at the Virginia Tennis Facility at the Boar's Head Resort in Charlottesville, Virginia. During the indoor portion of their season, they play on the Boyd Tinsley Courts at the nearby Boar's Head Sports Club.

Virginia has won five recent NCAA Championships, their first in 2013 followed by three consecutive national titles in 2015–2017 and then again in 2022.

History
The program first experienced a major renaissance when the program built new facilities and hired former coach Brian Boland as head coach in 2002. In his third season, he led the team to their first ACC regular season and tournament titles. The Cavaliers reached their first finals of the NCAA Division I Men's Tennis Championship in 2011, falling to the USC Trojans by a score of 4-3.  The program's first NCAA title came two years later, with the Cavaliers defeating UCLA in the finals.

The team has won the NCAA championship five times, in 2013, 2015, 2016, 2017, and 2022. Their 2013 title was the first men's tennis title won by an ACC team. Additionally, the team has also won the ITA National Team Indoor Championship six times. The Cavaliers have won the ACC regular season title 13 times, all consecutively from 2004 to 2016. They were also the ACC Tournament champions in 11 of those years. From April 2006 to February 2016, the Virginia Cavaliers men's tennis team beat 140 consecutive ACC opponents. This winning streak is a record across all ACC sports.

On May 24, 2017, Andres Pedroso was named director of tennis and head coach of the team, replacing Boland who had accepted the Head of Men's Tennis position at USTA Player Development.

On May 22, 2022, the Cavaliers swept Kentucky to win their 5th National Championship. This 4-0 victory concluded an impressive tournament run from the Cavaliers, beating the SEC's best to offer in South Carolina, Florida, Tennessee and the aforementioned Kentucky Wildcats.

Notable former players
Collin Altamirano 
JC Aragone
Somdev Devvarman 
Treat Huey
Dominic Inglot
Jarmere Jenkins
Thai-Son Kwiatkowski - Liam Draxl's father
Brandon Nakashima
Alexander Ritschard
Ryan Shane 
Sanam Singh
Carl Söderlund 
Brian Vahaly
Gianni Ross

Honors

Individual NCAA Champions

Singles
Somdev Devvarman, 2007 & 2008
Ryan Shane, 2015
Thai-Son Kwiatkowski, 2017

Doubles
Dominic Inglot and Michael Shabaz, 2009
Drew Courtney and Michael Shabaz, 2010
Jarmere Jenkins and Mac Styslinger, 2013
|}

All-Americans

Brian Vahaly (1999, 2000, 2001)
Huntley Montgomery (2001)
Doug Stewart (2004, 2005)
Somdev Devvarman (2006, 2007, 2008)
Nick Meythaler (2006)
Rylan Rizza (2006)
Treat Huey (2007, 2008)
Dominic Inglot (2008, 2009)
Michael Shabaz (2009, 2010, 2011)
Sanam Singh (2009, 2010)
Drew Courtney (2010, 2011, 2012)
Alex Domijan (2011, 2012, 2013, 2014)
Jarmere Jenkins (2012, 2013)
Mitchell Frank (2012, 2014, 2015)
Mac Styslinger (2013)
Ryan Shane (2015, 2016)
Luca Corinteli (2015, 2016)
Thai-Son Kwiatkowski (2015, 2016, 2017)
Carl Söderlund (2019, 2021)
Inaki Montes de la Torre (2022)
Chris Rodesch (2022)

ITA National Coach of the Year
Brian Boland, 2008 & 2016
Andres Pedroso, 2022

Information about honors and former players cited from the 2017 team fact book

References

External links
Official website